Ferd may refer to:

 Ferd (nickname), a list of people with the nickname, usually a short form of Ferdinand
 Ferd Napfel, 1960s American drag racer
 Ferd (company), a Norwegian holding company
 Melvin Ferd III, the hero and title character of in the 1984 film The Toxic Avenger and subsequent works
 Fire Emblem: Radiant Dawn, the tenth video game in the Fire Emblem series
 A title subject in the video The Continuing Story of Carel and Ferd

See also
 Ferd. Thürmer, a German piano manufacturer 
 Ferdinand (disambiguation)